This article is the discography of British sophisti-pop/jazz-funk band Matt Bianco.

Albums

Studio albums

Compilation albums

Video albums

EPs

Singles

References 

Discographies of British artists
Pop music group discographies